Vitrinella bifilata is a species of gastropod in the family Tornidae. The scientific name of this species was first published in 1857 by Carpenter.

Distribution
This marine species occurs off Panama.

References

 Carpenter P. (1857), Report on the present state of our knowledge with regard to the West Coast Of North America; London, 1857
Keen, A. M. 1971. Sea Shells of Tropical West America. Marine mollusks from Baja California to Peru, ed. 2. Stanford University Press. xv, 1064 pp., 22 pls.

Tornidae
Gastropods described in 1857